Daniel Phillips is an English special effects make-up artist known for his work on films Florence Foster Jenkins, Dracula Untold, Closed Circuit, The Duchess, The Queen, and Victoria & Abdul, for which he was nominated with Lou Sheppard for the Academy Award for Best Makeup and Hairstyling in the 90th Academy Awards.

References

External links
 

Living people
Best Makeup BAFTA Award winners
Special effects people
Year of birth missing (living people)